Nebria rhilensis is a species of beetle in the family Carabidae that is endemic to Rila, Bulgaria.

References

External links
Nebria rhilensis at Fauna Europaea

rhilensis
Beetles of Europe
Endemic fauna of Bulgaria
Beetles described in 1879